"We Are Your Tomorrow" is a song by Swedish singer David Lindgren. The song was released in Sweden as a digital download on 28 February 2016, and was written by Anderz Wrethov, Sharon Vaughn, and Gustav Efraimsson. It took part in Melodifestivalen 2016, and qualified to the final from the second semi-final. It placed 11th in the final.

Track listing

Chart performance

Weekly charts

Release history

References

2015 songs
2016 singles
Melodifestivalen songs of 2016
David Lindgren songs
Songs written by Wrethov
Songs written by Sharon Vaughn
English-language Swedish songs
Warner Music Group singles